"Ya Ghayeb" "(You, Who is Absent)" is the lead single from Lebanese singer Fadl Shaker's 2002 album, widely considered the most successful single in his career. It broke sales records, going to number one in the Middle East and staying on the charts for more than a year.

Background
Ya Ghayeb's melody was taken from the Greek composer Sotis Volanis, who gave the rights to Fadel. When Prince Turki El Sudairy listened to the melody he wrote to Fadel with lyrics for the song.

Charts

References

2006 singles
2002 songs